The Seiler Building on First St. E. in Jamestown, North Dakota was built in 1904.  It was designed by George & Walter Hancock.

It was listed on the National Register of Historic Places (NRHP) in 1986.

According to its NRHP nomination, the building was nominated due to its association with O. J. Seller and architects George and Walter Hancock, its Beaux Arts architecture, and its "fine integrity of design, materials, workmanship, feeling and association."

References

Commercial buildings on the National Register of Historic Places in North Dakota
Beaux-Arts architecture in North Dakota
Commercial buildings completed in 1904
Buildings and structures in Jamestown, North Dakota
National Register of Historic Places in Stutsman County, North Dakota
1904 establishments in North Dakota